The 934th Aircraft Control and Warning Squadron is an inactive United States Air Force unit. It was last assigned to the Air Forces Iceland, stationed at Latrar Air Station (H-4), Iceland. It was inactivated on 8 October 1960.

From 1956 to 1960, the unit was a General Surveillance Radar squadron providing for the air defense of Iceland and the North Atlantic.

Lineage
Constituted as the 934th Aircraft Control and Warning Squadron
 Activated on 8 September 1956
 Inactivated on 8 October 1960

Assignments
1400th Operations Group, 8 September 1956
Air Forces Iceland, 1 July 1960 – 8 October 1960

Stations
Keflavik Airport, Iceland, 8 September 1956
Latrar Air Station, Iceland, 20 May 1957 – 8 October 1960

References

Radar squadrons of the United States Air Force